Thern is a surname. Notable people with the surname include:

Jonas Thern (born 1967), Swedish association football manager and former professional player who played as a midfielder
Károly Thern (1817–1886), Hungarian composer, pianist, conductor and arranger
Simon Thern (born 1992), Swedish footballer
Willi and Louis Thern: Willi (1847–1911) and Louis (1848–1920), Hungarian pianists and teachers

See also
Thern Promontory, high ice-covered promontory at the south end of Eisenhower Range in Victoria Land
Therns, manipulating and secretive fictional alien race on the planet of Barsoom (Mars) in the novel A Princess of Mars by Edgar Rice Burroughs
Thearne
Thurne
Thürnen